The Blanche river (in French: rivière Blanche) is a tributary of the Nicolet River which flows on the south shore of the St. Lawrence river. The Blanche river flows entirely in the municipality of Chesterville, in the Arthabaska Regional County Municipality (MRC), in the Centre-du-Québec region, in the province of Quebec, in Canada.

Geography 

The neighboring hydrographic slopes of the Blanche River are:
 north side: Gobeil stream, Bulstrode River, L'Heureux stream;
 east side: Gobeil stream, Marras stream, rivière du Huit, Bulstrode River;
 south side: Nicolet River, Aulnes stream;
 west side: Dumont River, Brooks River, Nicolet River.

 
It flows over  according to the following segmentsː
  southwesterly, crossing Chemin du Rang Campagna and Chemin Craig Nord, to the confluence of a stream (coming from the north);
  southward, up to the confluence of the Chûtes mortes stream;
  southward, passing under the Rang Fréchette road bridge and under the Rang Saint-Philippe road bridge, to the confluence of the Hamel watercourse;
  towards the southwest, crossing route 161, to its mouth.

Toponymy 

The toponym "rivière Blanche" was made official on September 5, 1985, at the Commission de toponymie du Québec.

See also 

 List of rivers of Quebec

References 

Arthabaska Regional County Municipality
Rivers of Centre-du-Québec